The Grand Tower Mining, Manufacturing and Transportation Company Site is a  industrial site located in Devil's Backbone Park in Grand Tower, Illinois. The site was operated by the Grand Tower Mining, Manufacturing and Transportation Company, a mining and industrial company which operated in Illinois in the 1860s and 1870s. The furnaces at the site were used to produce coke, a fuel produced from the coal used in iron smelting. The site also includes the remains of the superintendent's house; a local legend claims that the house is haunted by the superintendent's daughter.

The site was added to the National Register of Historic Places on April 13, 1979.

References

Industrial buildings and structures on the National Register of Historic Places in Illinois
Industrial buildings completed in 1869
Buildings and structures in Jackson County, Illinois
1869 establishments in Illinois
National Register of Historic Places in Jackson County, Illinois